Rhys Jenkins is a rugby union player for Newport RFC and the Newport Gwent Dragons regional team. He is a Wales Under 18 and Under 20 international.

A back row forward, Jenkins joined Newport RFC from Ebbw Vale RFC at the start of the 2010–11 season. He made his debut for Newport Gwent Dragons regional team against the Ospreys on 7 May 2010 as a second-half replacement. He was released by Newport Gwent Dragons at the end of the 2011–12 season  and joined Newport RFC

References

External links
Newport Gwent Dragons profile

1990 births
Living people
Ebbw Vale RFC players
Dragons RFC players
Newport RFC players
Welsh rugby union players
People from Caerleon
Rugby union players from Newport, Wales
People educated at Caerleon Comprehensive School